Park Jin-sub (born March 11, 1977) is a former South Korean football defender and current manager of Busan IPark.

Club career 
His playing career was spent in South Korea with Sangmu (2000–2001) while in the army, Ulsan Hyundai Horang-i (2002–2005), Seongnam Ilhwa Chunma (2005–2008), Busan I'Park (2009–2010), and Ulsan Hyundai Mipo Dockyard Dolphin (2011–2012).

International career 
Park Jin-sub has represented South Korea at youth level and part of the senior team squads. Between 1998 and 2004 he played 35 times and all of his 5 goals scored against Nepal on September 29, 2003.

Managerial career 
On 18 December 2017, Park was officially appointed as Gwangju FC manager.

On 8 December 2020, Park was officially appointed as FC Seoul manager.

On 6 January 2022 Park Jin-sub became manager of Jeonbuk Hyundai Motors B Team, for Jeonbuk Hyundai Motors's first season outside of the youth leagues as their reserve team participates in the K4 League along with other Reserve Teams.

On 3 June 2022, he was appointed as the new manager of Busan IPark after resignation of Ricardo Peres.

Career statistics

International goals 
1Results list South Korea's goal tally first.

Honours

Player
Ulsan Hyundai FC
 K League 1: 2005

Manager
Gwangju FC
 K League 2: 2019

External links

 National Team Player Record 
 
 

1977 births
Living people
Association football fullbacks
South Korean footballers
South Korean football managers
South Korea international footballers
Gimcheon Sangmu FC players
Ulsan Hyundai FC players
Seongnam FC players
Busan IPark players
Ulsan Hyundai Mipo Dockyard FC players
Gwangju FC managers
FC Seoul managers
Busan IPark managers
K League 1 players
Korea National League players
Footballers at the 2000 Summer Olympics
2000 CONCACAF Gold Cup players
2000 AFC Asian Cup players
2004 AFC Asian Cup players
Olympic footballers of South Korea
Footballers from Seoul
Korea University alumni
Footballers at the 1998 Asian Games
Asian Games competitors for South Korea